Luis Ovsejevich (Buenos Aires, born September 13, 1941) is an Argentine lawyer and businessman, founder and president of the Konex Foundation, from its creation in 1980. Through it the Konex Awards have been granted annually since 1980 to personalities and institutions standing out for his, her or its achievements in 10 different fields. He made various cultural contributions, such as "Let´s go to the Music" since 1991, which consist in operas, ballets, concerts, tango and comedy adapted specially for children; he decided to open Konex Cultural City (Ciudad Cultural Konex) in 2005, it is a space where all type of cultural expressions coexist with the objective to contribute to the cultural and artistic enrichment of the community; since 2015 he produce the Konex Festival of Classical Music in Ciudad Cultural Konex.

He is a lawyer graduated from the University of Buenos Aires, he exerted teaching from 1962 to 1974 in the Faculty of Law and Faculty of Economic Sciences at the University of Buenos Aires and has published several works, out of which Legitimate (1963), Common Market (1964), Private Law Institutions (1969), Consent (1971), Invalidity and Inefficiency as a result of Will Anomalies (1973), stand out among others. He was the President of the Rotary Club of Buenos Aires in the 2017-2018 period. In the 60's he was a law profesor in University of Buenos Aires and in University of Morón. He also is a piano teacher.

As a businessman, he is the founder and former president of the Konex-Canon Company from Argentina, created in 1969; in 1998 he transferred the total of the shareholding package to Canon USA.

He was General Director, ad honorem, of the Colón Theater in 1998 and 1999.

References

External links 
 Luis Ovsejevich – Konex Foundation 

1945 births
Living people
Argentine art collectors
20th-century Argentine lawyers
Lawyers from Buenos Aires
University of Buenos Aires alumni
Argentine legal scholars